Die Bernauerin is a piece in Bavarian dialect by the composer Carl Orff to his own libretto on the life of Agnes Bernauer. It was first performed on 15 June 1947 in Stuttgart.

Recordings
Die Bernauerin, Agnes: Christine Ostermayer, The Duke: , Tenor solo: Horst Laubenthal, Soprano solo: Lucia Popp, Munich Radio Orchestra, conducted Kurt Eichhorn. Orfeo, ADD, 1978/1980

References

Operas by Carl Orff
1947 operas
Operas based on real people
German-language operas
Operas set in the 15th century
Operas